Sainte-Suzanne is a commune in the Ariège department in southwestern France.

Geography
The Lèze flows north through the middle of the commune and crosses the village.

Population
Inhabitants Sainte-Suzanne are called Sainte-Suzannois.

See also
Communes of the Ariège department

References

Communes of Ariège (department)
Ariège communes articles needing translation from French Wikipedia